Maria Balomenaki (born March 14, 1983) is a retired Greek water polo player. She played for Olympiacos for 12 seasons (2001–2013) and was the team's captain for several years. She won 2 Greek Championships (2008–09, 2010–11) and numerous European honours (2007–08 LEN Trophy runners-up, 2010–11 LEN Champions Cup third place among many others).

References

1983 births
Living people
Greek female water polo players
Olympiacos Women's Water Polo Team players
Water polo players from Chania
21st-century Greek women